The organic compound 3-pyridylnicotinamide (3-pna), also known as N-(pyridin-3-yl)nicotinamide, is a kinked dipodal dipyridine that is synthesized through the reaction of nicotinoyl chloride and 3-aminopyridine.  The nitrogen atoms on its pyridine rings, like those of its isomer 4-pyridylnicotinamide, can donate their electron lone pairs to metal cations, allowing it to bridge metal centers and act as a bidentate ligand in coordination polymers.  It can be used to synthesize polymers that have potentially useful gas adsorption properties.

References

Chelating agents
Nicotinamides